The 1999–2000 Fussball Club Basel 1893 season was their 106th season since the club's foundation. Following their promotion in the 1993–94 season this was their sixth consecutive season in the highest tier of Swiss football.
René C. Jäggi was the club's chairman for the fourth year. FC Basel played their home games in the Stadion Schützenmatte while the new stadium was being built.

Overview 
On 15 June 1999 Christian Gross was appointed as the new first team trainer and he assigned Ruedi Zbinden as his co-trainer. Forming his new team, Gross made a number of signings before the season started. These new signings included defensive players such as Alexandre Quennoz, who signed from Sion, Ivan Knez from Luzern and Murat Yakin who came from Fenerbahçe and forwards such as George Koumantarakis who signed in from Luzern, Didier Tholot from Sion and Thomas Häberli from Kriens. The most interest was raised in the signing of Pascal Zuberbühler in a goalkeeper swap with Stefan Huber who then went to Grasshopper Club. In the outwards direction Mario Frick transferred to Zürich, Abedi to Yverdon and Fabrice Henry to Hibernian (on loan).

The Campaign

Pre-season friendlies 
Before the domestic League season started on 7 July Basel had little time to get things ready. They organised one test game against lower tier SR Delémont, which was played in Laufen and won 2–0, and they entered the Sempione Cup, which was played in Balsthal. Here Basel played the semi-final against Brasilian team Ituano FC, which was lost, and the third place match against Croatian Dinamo Zagreb, in which they also suffered a defeat.

Domestic League 
The qualifying round of the League season 1999–2000 was contested by twelve teams. The first eight teams of the First Stage (or Qualification) were then to compete in the Championship Round. The season started on 7 July. Basel's priority aim was to reach the Championship stage and end the season in the top three. The season started sub-optimal, the team remained unbeaten, but with just three wins and four draws in the first seven rounds, they lost contact to the table leaders. Following their first defeat, in the away game against Lausanne-Sport, Basel improved their position in the table with another three victories. Basel suffered their first home defeat on 2 October against Yverdon-Sports, but they ended the Qualification Round in second position in the league table.

The Championship Round started on 12 March 2000. The participating teams took half of the points (rounded up to complete units) gained in the Qualification as bonus with them. Basel played amongst the table leaders and in the tenth round they even managed a 3–1 victory against league leaders St. Gallen. However, in their last four matches Basel won only two further points and dropped to third position behind champions St Gallen and Lausanne, against whom the final game of the season ended in a 0–3 home defeat on 7 June 2000. Nevertheless, Basel qualified for the 2000–01 UEFA Cup.

Domestic Cup 
Basel's clear aim for the Swiss Cup was to win the title. In the round of 32, they were drawn away against Mendrisio. In the next round a home game against Grasshopper Club, ended in a draw and was eventually won in the penalty shoot out. The quarterfinal against Lausanne-Sport ended the cup run. Lausanne continued and advanced to the final, but here they were beaten by Zürich in a penalty shoot-out.

Europe 
Basel were qualified for the 1999 UEFA Intertoto Cup. The first round was played against Slovenian team Korotan Prevalje on 20 and 26 June 1999 and won 6–0 on aggregate. The second round draw brought the Czech Republic club Boby Brno to Basel on 4 July. The return leg a week later gave Basel a 4–2 victory on aggregate. Although the first leg of the third round was won away from home against Hamburg, the Germans won the second leg in the Stadion Schützenmatte and Hamburg proceeded due to the away goals rule.

Players

First team squad 
The following is the list of the Basel first team squad. It includes all players that were in the squad the day the season started on 7 July 1999 but subsequently left the club after that date and it includes all players that transferred in during the season.

Transfers in

Transfers out

Results 
Legend

Friendly matches

Pre- and mid-season

Winter break

Nationalliga A

Qualifying phase

League table

Championship group

League table 
The first eight teams of the Qualification phase competed in the Championship Playoff Round. They took half of the points (rounded up to complete units) gained in the Qualification as Bonus with them.

Swiss Cup

1999 UIC 

First round

Basel won 6–0 on aggregate.

Second round

Basel won 4–2 on aggregate.

Third round

3–3 on aggregate, Hamburg won on away goals rule.

References

Sources
 Rotblau: Jahrbuch Saison 2015/2016. Publisher: FC Basel Marketing AG. 
 Rotblau: Jahrbuch Saison 2017/2018. Publisher: FC Basel Marketing AG. 
 Die ersten 125 Jahre / 2018. Publisher: Josef Zindel im Friedrich Reinhardt Verlag, Basel. 
 1999–2000 at Joggeli.ch
 1999–2000 at RSSSF

External links
 FC Basel official site

FC Basel seasons
Basel